The Big Night is a 1976 Swiss film directed by Francis Reusser. It won the Golden Leopard at the 1976 Locarno International Film Festival.

Plot
Five leninists get in trouble while trying to serve their ideals.

Cast
 Niels Arestrup as Léon
 Jacqueline Parent as Léa
 Arnold Walter as Raoul
 François Berthet as René
 Marina Bucher as Marina
 Jacques Roman as Félix

Reception
It won  the Golden Leopard at the 1976 Locarno International Film Festival.

References

External links

1976 films
Swiss drama films
1970s French-language films
Films directed by Francis Reusser
Golden Leopard winners
French-language Swiss films